Lieutenant-Colonel Barwick Sharpe Browne (1881 - 27 August 1963) was a British Army officer, the first librarian of the Institute of Archaeology (1936–38), and a fellow of the Society of Antiquaries of London.

Early life
Barwick Sharpe Browne was born in 1881. His father was Walter Raleigh Browne, a civil engineer. He was educated at Shrewsbury School (left 1898) and the Royal Military Academy, Woolwich.

First World War
Browne was commissioned into the Royal Garrison Artillery as a second lieutenant (1900) becoming a lieutenant in 1901. He served throughout the First World War during which time he commanded a battery.

Inter-war years
After leaving the army, Browne lived in London. In 1922, he married Enid Marjorie Moore at St John the Evangelist parish church in Westminster. Enid became a doctor and anaesthetist. They had two sons and a daughter. Their eldest son died in 1947 and Enid died in 1961.
 
Browne was the first librarian of the Institute of Archaeology (1936–38) and a fellow of the Society of Antiquaries of London.

The Brownes moved to Gloucestershire in 1938.

Second World War
During the Second World War, Browne served in the Royal Air Force and the Royal Navy.

Death
Browne died on 27 August 1963.

References

External links 
Browne family of Bournstream, Wotton-under-Edge.

1881 births
1963 deaths
Fellows of the Society of Antiquaries of London
People associated with the UCL Institute of Archaeology
People educated at Shrewsbury School
British Army personnel of World War I
Royal Artillery officers